Ronald William Mansfield (31 December 1923 – April 1997) was an English footballer who played as a winger in the Football League.

References

External links
Ron Mansfield's Career

1923 births
1997 deaths
English footballers
Footballers from Romford
Association football midfielders
Ilford F.C. players
Sittingbourne F.C. players
Southend United F.C. players
Millwall F.C. players
English Football League players